LeRoy is an unincorporated community in the town of LeRoy in Dodge County, Wisconsin, United States. It is located at the intersection of County Y and County YY several miles west of Knowles.

References

Unincorporated communities in Dodge County, Wisconsin
Unincorporated communities in Wisconsin